Ajit Bhandari (born 7 February 1994) is a Nepalese footballer who plays as a defender for Nepal Police Club and the Nepal national team.

International career
Bhandari made his international debut in a goalless friendly draw against Kuwait on 21 March 2019. He earned a yellow card in the match.

International statistics

Honours

Club
Nepal Police Club
 Aaha! Gold Cup: 2018

Individual
 Aaha! Gold Cup Best Defender: 2018

References

External links
 
 

Living people
1994 births
Nepalese footballers
Nepal international footballers
Association football defenders
People from Pokhara
Footballers at the 2014 Asian Games
Asian Games competitors for Nepal